The Telposta Towers is the seventh-tallest building in Nairobi, Kenya. The building is located in Kenyatta Avenue, near the center of Nairobi. It is 120 meters or 394 feet in height. The towers have 27 floors, and house Telkom Kenya.  Kenya's Ministry of Information and Communications and Kenya's Ministry of Trade are based in the building. Construction of the towers was started in 1996, and completed in 1999. It was designed by Anthony Gleeson and constructed by Laxmanbhai Construction.

Relative Heights in Kenya, Nairobi 
Now just the 7th tallest building in Kenya, behind the Britam Tower, UAP Old Mutual Tower, Times Tower, Prism Tower, Le'Mac, and Parliament Tower. When completed in 1999, it was the third tallest. It is 120 metres tall. Or 394 ft. The building has 24 floors above ground.

Power and Services 
Power for the towers are provided by  the monopoly power company, Kenya Power and Lighting Company. Two diesel generators are used to provide standby Power. They gifted from the UK by Welland Power. One generator provides power for the building services, the other for the fire pumps.

See also
New Central Bank Tower

References

Buildings and structures in Nairobi
Skyscraper office buildings in Kenya